Palaiokastro is a village and a community of the Voio municipality. Before the 2011 local government reform it was part of the municipality of Siatista, of which it was a municipal district. The 2011 census recorded 239 inhabitants in the village and 311 inhabitants in the community of Palaiokastro. The community of Palaiokastro covers an area of 47.525 km2.

Administrative division
The community of Palaiokastro consists of two separate settlements: 
Dafnero (population 72)
Palaiokastro (population 239)
The aforementioned population figures are as of 2011.

History

The first references of Paleokastro, are at year 1460 a.C., when after the fall of Constantinople hundreds inhabitants of the Macedonian region took refuge in the mountains to hide from the Ottomans.

At the end of the 19th century Paleocastro was a village in Nahiya Wreaths of the Ottoman Empire. The church "St. John the Baptist" has two inscriptions - the sanctuary of September 1834, mentioning Metropolitan Gerasim of Grevena and over the main entrance of October 1848, mentioning Metropolitan Ioakim of Grevena. The church "St. Nicholas" in the mountains Voice is built on the foundations of an older temple.

According to statistics of Vasil Kanchov in 1900, Paleokastro was a village in Kozani with 217 inhabitants Christian Greeks and 215 Muslim Greeks, but the ethnic card of the village is shown as a purely Greek. According to the secretary of the Bulgarian Exarchate Dimitar Mishev ( "La Macédoine et sa Population Chrétienne") in 1905 in Paleokastro were 243 Christian Greeks.

According to statistics of the Greek consulate in Elassona 1904 Paleocastro was a village  as 470 ethnic Greeks residents -the 100% of the population-.

The villagers participated actively  in the Macedonian Struggle in the early 20th century.

During the Balkan War in 1912 the village entered the Greek State.

See also
List of settlements in the Kozani regional unit

References

Populated places in Kozani (regional unit)
Siatista